WQPC (94.3 FM, "Q94 Great Country") is a radio station broadcasting a country music format. Licensed to Prairie du Chien, Wisconsin, United States, the station is owned by Robinson Corporation and features programming from ABC News Radio.

References

External links
 
 

Country radio stations in the United States
QPC
Crawford County, Wisconsin